Bolboceras insulare, is a species of dor beetle found in India, and Sri Lanka.

Description
This species has an average length of about 9 to 10 mm. Body small to medium-sized, with uniformly brown color. Clypeal ridge has a characteristic x-shape in male whereas female has a trapeziform clypeus. Cross-point of perimarginal clypeal ridges is slightly protuberant. Parameral apex is blunt. Interocular ridge is relatively short, tri-undulate to tri-tuberculate. Pronotal protrusions strongly reduced. Labrum with slightly concave anterior margin, and a distinct transverse ridge. Clypeofrons abundantly to sparsely, distinctly punctate in front. Pronotum anteromedially slightly depressed laterally. Pronotal surface with double punctation. Primary punctation is laterally, anteriorly abundant, but secondary punctures are sparse, and minute. Scutellum with scattered, relatively sparse, double punctation. Elytra with shallowly and finely punctate impressed discal striae. Elytral interstriae scarcely convex, vaguely, very sparsely, minutely punctate. Protibia with 6 distinct external denticles. Aedeagus with slenderhooked-recurved tip and short, blunt parameres.

References

Bolboceratidae
Insects of Sri Lanka
Insects described in 2013